Bryan Edward Stainton (born 8 January 1942) is an English former footballer who scored made 25 appearances in the Football League playing for Lincoln City as a defender. He also played non-league football for Ingham and for Gainsborough Trinity.

References

1942 births
Living people
People from Scampton
English footballers
Association football defenders
Lincoln City F.C. players
Gainsborough Trinity F.C. players
English Football League players